Horst Weber (20 August 1939 – 2002) was a German swimmer. He competed in the men's 200 metre butterfly at the 1956 Summer Olympics.

References

External links
 
 

1939 births
2002 deaths
German male swimmers
Olympic swimmers of the United Team of Germany
Swimmers at the 1956 Summer Olympics
Place of birth missing